Lana, Queen of the Amazons (German: Lana - Königin der Amazonen) is a 1964 West German-Brazilian adventure film written and directed by Cyl Farney and Géza von Cziffra and starring Anton Diffring, Catherine Schell and Christian Wolff.

The film's sets were designed by the art director Alexandre Horvat. Location shooting took place in Brazil in Belém, Rio de Janeiro and along the Amazon River.

Cast
Anton Diffring as Professor Van Vries 
Catherine Schell as Queen Lana 
Christian Wolff as Peter van Vries 
Michael Hinz as Matteo 
Yara Lex as Tahira 
Dieter Eppler as Giovanni di Araúza / Gerónimo de Araújo 
Haydee Pinto as Amazon #2 
Átila Iório as Black guide / Casanova
Adalberto Silva as White guide

References

External links

1960s adventure films
German adventure films
West German films
Brazilian adventure films
Films directed by Géza von Cziffra
Jungle girls
1960s German films